Siriusgnathus is a traversodontid cynodont from the Carnian channel sandstones and mudstones of the Candelária Formation, belonging to the Santa Maria Supersequence of the Paraná Basin in southeastern Brazil. It includes one species, Siriusgnathus niemeyerorum and was described in 2018. The species epithet refers to the Niemeyer locality in Agudo, Rio Grande do Sul. It was found together with various archosauromorphs, dinosauromorphs and other cynodonts, such as Brasilitherium riograndensis, Brasilodon quadrangularis, Irajatherium hernandezi and Prozostrodon brasiliensis.

See also 
 2018 in paleontology

References

Bibliography 
 
 

Traversodontids
Prehistoric cynodont genera
Carnian genera
Late Triassic synapsids of South America
Triassic Brazil
Fossils of Brazil
Paraná Basin
Fossil taxa described in 2018